The New Zealand Cup is a thoroughbred horse race run at the Riccarton Park Racecourse in Christchurch.

New Zealand Cup week

The New Zealand Cup is raced on the final Saturday of Christchurch "Cup week" held each year in the second week of November.

For thoroughbred horses the week also features:

 the New Zealand 1000 Guineas for 3 year old fillies,
 the New Zealand 2000 Guineas for 3 year olds,
 the Stewards Handicap sprint, and
 the Coupland's Bakeries Mile.  

Christchurch Cup week includes premier standardbred meetings at Addington raceway including:
 the New Zealand Trotting Cup for pacers on the Tuesday.
 the New Zealand Free For All for pacers on the Friday.
 the Dominion Handicap for trotters on the Friday. 

There is also greyhound racing on the Thursday, including the following Group 1 races:
 the New Zealand Galaxy - C5f 295m.
 the New Zealand Greyhound Cup - C5f 520m.
 the New Zealand Stayers Cup - C2df 732m.

History of the New Zealand Cup

The New Zealand Cup is one of the oldest races in New Zealand having been run each year since 1865. It is a race for stayers, over 3200 metres, which is also the distance of the Auckland Cup, Wellington Cup as well as some major Australian races such as the Melbourne Cup. 

Despite it dropping over time from a Group 1 race down to Group 3 status, it remains one of the most popular racing events in New Zealand with the 150th running in 2013.

Maree Lyndon was the first female jockey to win a Group I race in New Zealand when winning the 1982 Cup on Sirtain.

Notable winners include:

 2011 & 2012 - Blood Brotha, the 2013 Wellington Cup winner.
 1995 & 1998 - Sapio, the winner of the 1997 Tattersall's Cup (Eagle Farm) and Doomben Cup.
 1987 – Empire Rose, the 1988 Melbourne Cup winner.
 1985 - Samasaan, the 1986 Wellington Cup winner.
 1974 – Fury's Order, the 1975 Cox Plate winner.
 1973 - Watallan winning the Cup as a 10 year old, for his 21st victory from 111 starts, and paying a $98 dividend.
 1935 – Cuddle, 2x winner of the Auckland Cup and the Doncaster Handicap.
 1930 – Nightmarch, winner of the 1929 Cox Plate and Melbourne Cup.
 1918 - Sasanof, two years after becoming the first New Zealand owned, trained, and bred Melbourne Cup winner.

Group Status

 1865-1977 (Principal Race)
 1978-1990 (Group 1)
 1991-2008 (Group 2) 
 2009- (Group 3)

Race results

Previous winners

 1969 – Middy
 1968 – Noir Filou
 1967 – Laramie
 1966 – Royal Bid
 1965 – Fieldmaster
 1964 – Alaska
 1963 – Beauzami
 1962 – Stipulate
 1961 – Quite Able
 1960 – Oreka
 1959 – Foglia d'Oro
 1958 – Balfast
 1957 – Great Scot
 1956 – Jimmy Flash
 1955 – Poetical
 1954 – Dormant
 1953 – Gold Scheme
 1952 – Conclusion
 1951 – Jamell
 1950 – Calibrate
 1949 – Excellency
 1948 – Sir Garnish
 1947 – Beau Le Havre
 1946 – Catterick Bridge
 1945 – Golden Souvenir
 1944 – Kevin
 1943 – Classform 
 1942 – Royal Lancer
 1941 – Happy Ending
 1940 – Serenata
 1939 – Yours Truly
 1938 – Arctic King
 1937 – Cerne Abbas
 1936 – Ferson (AUS)
 1935 – Cuddle
 1934 – Steeton
 1933 – Palantua
 1932 – Fast Passage
 1931 – Spearful
 1930 – Nightmarch
 1929 – Chide
 1928 – Oratrix
 1927 – Rapier
 1926 – Count Cavour
 1925 – The Banker
 1924 – Sunart
 1923 – Rouen
 1922 – Scion
 1921 – Royal Star
 1920 – Oratress
 1919 – Vagabond
 1918 – Sasanof
 1917 – Menelaus
 1916 – Ardenvhor
 1915 – Tangihau
 1914 – Inigo
 1914 – Warstep
 1913 – Sinapis
 1912 – Midnight Sun
 1911 – Vice Admiral
 1910 – Bridge
 1909 – Lady Lucy
 1908 – Downfall
 1907 – Frisco
 1906 – Star Rose
 1905 – Noctuiform
 1904 – Grand Rapids
 1903 – Canteen
 1902 – Halberdier
 1901 – Tortulla
 1900 – Fulmen
 1900 – Ideal
 1899 – Seahorse
 1898 – Tirant d'Eau
 1897 – Waiuku
 1896 – Lady Zetland
 1895 – Euroclydon
 1894 – Impulse
 1893 – Rosefeldt
 1892 – St. Hippo
 1891 – British Lion
 1890 – Wolverine
 1889 – Tirailleur
 1888 – Manton
 1887 – Lochiel
 1886 – Spade Guinea
 1885 – Fusilade
 1884 – Vanguard
 1883 – Tasman (AUS)
 1882 – Welcome Jack
 1881 – Grip
 1880 – Le Loup
 1879 – Chancellor
 1878 – Maritana
 1877 – Mata
 1876 – Guy Fawkes
 1875 – Nectar
 1874 – Tambourini
 1873 – Kakapo
 1872 – Detractor
 1871 – Peeress
 1870 – Knottingley (Dec)
 1870 – Knottingley (Jan)
 1869 – Mainsail
 1868 – Flying Jib
 1867 – Magenta
 1866 – Nourmahal
 1865 – Rob Roy

See also
  Recent winners of major NZ cups
 Wellington Cup
 Auckland Cup

References

 https://tbheritage.com/TurfHallmarks/racecharts/NewZealand/NewZealandCup.html
 http://www.nzracing.co.nz
 http://www.tab.co.nz
 http://www.racebase.co.nz
 Sporting Records of New Zealand. Todd, Sydney. (1976) Auckland, New Zealand: Moa Publications.  
  The Great Decade of New Zealand racing 1970–1980. Glengarry, Jack. William Collins Publishers Ltd, Wellington, New Zealand.
 New Zealand Thoroughbred Racing Annual 2018 (47th edition). Dennis Ryan, Editor, Racing Media NZ Limited, Auckland, New Zealand.
 New Zealand Thoroughbred Racing Annual 2017 (46th edition). Dennis Ryan, Editor, Racing Media NZ Limited, Auckland, New Zealand.
 New Zealand Thoroughbred Racing Annual 2012 (41st edition). Birch, Andrew, Editor. New Zealand Thoroughbred Marketing, Hamilton, New Zealand.
 New Zealand Thoroughbred Racing Annual 2009 (39th edition). Clark, Adrian, Editor. New Zealand Thoroughbred Marketing, Hamilton, New Zealand.
 New Zealand Thoroughbred Racing Annual 2008 (37th edition). Bradford, David, Editor. Bradford Publishing Limited, Paeroa, New Zealand.
 New Zealand Thoroughbred Racing Annual 2005 (34th edition). Bradford, David, Editor. Bradford Publishing Limited, Paeroa, New Zealand.
 New Zealand Thoroughbred Racing Annual 2004 (33rd edition). Bradford, David, Editor. Bradford Publishing Limited, Paeroa, New Zealand.
 New Zealand Thoroughbred Racing Annual 2000 (29th edition). Bradford, David, Editor. Bradford Publishing Limited, Auckland, New Zealand.
 New Zealand Thoroughbred Racing Annual 1997 (26th edition). Dillon, Mike, Editor. Mike Dillon's Racing Enterprises Ltd, Auckland, New Zealand.
 New Zealand Thoroughbred Racing Annual 1995 (24th edition). Dillon, Mike, Editor. Mike Dillon's Racing Enterprises Ltd, Auckland, New Zealand.
 New Zealand Thoroughbred Racing Annual 1994 (23rd edition). Dillon, Mike, Editor. Meadowset Publishing, Auckland, New Zealand.
 New Zealand Thoroughbred Racing Annual 1991 (20th edition). Dillon, Mike, Editor. Moa Publications, Auckland, New Zealand.
 New Zealand Thoroughbred Racing Annual 1990 (19th edition). Dillon, Mike, Editor. Moa Publications, Auckland, New Zealand.
 New Zealand Thoroughbred Racing Annual 1987 (16th edition). Dillon, Mike, Editor. Moa Publications, Auckland, New Zealand.
 New Zealand Thoroughbred Racing Annual 1986 (15th edition). Dillon, Mike, Editor. Moa Publications, Auckland, New Zealand.
 New Zealand Thoroughbred Racing Annual 1985 (14th edition). Costello, John, Editor. Moa Publications, Auckland, New Zealand.
 New Zealand Thoroughbred Racing Annual 1984 (13th edition). Costello, John, Editor. Moa Publications, Auckland, New Zealand.
 New Zealand Thoroughbred Racing Annual 1983 (12th edition). Costello, John, Editor. Moa Publications, Auckland, New Zealand.
 New Zealand Thoroughbred Racing Annual 1982 (11th edition). Costello, John, Editor. Moa Publications, Auckland, New Zealand.
 New Zealand Thoroughbred Racing Annual 1981 (10th edition). Costello, John, Editor. Moa Publications, Auckland, New Zealand.
 New Zealand Thoroughbred Racing Annual 1980 (9th edition). Costello, John, Editor. Moa Publications, Auckland, New Zealand.
 New Zealand Thoroughbred Racing Annual 1979 (8th edition).Costello, John, Editor. Moa Publications, Auckland, New Zealand.
 New Zealand Thoroughbred Racing Annual 1978 (7th edition).Costello, John, Editor. Moa Publications, Auckland, New Zealand.
 New Zealand Thoroughbred Racing Annual 1976. Costello, John, Editor. Moa Publications, Auckland.
 The DB Racing Annual 1974. Bradford, David, Editor. Moa Publications, Auckland.
 The DB Racing Annual 1972. Bradford, David, Editor. Moa Publications, Auckland.

Horse races in New Zealand
 
Autumn events in New Zealand
Open long distance horse races